Matthias Bartgis (1759 – 1825) was a pioneer German-American printer in Western Maryland, Virginia, and Pennsylvania.

Matthias Bartgis was born June 3, 1759 in Lancaster, Pennsylvania to a German immigrant, Matthias Bartgis. He learned the art of printing from William Bradford in Philadelphia and initially established a print office in York, Pennsylvania. In 1778 he expanded his business to Frederick, Maryland and later to Winchester, Virginia as well.  In 1788 Bartgis established a regular bi-weekly private mail system which stretched from York to Winchester to facilitate the delivery of his paper.

Until his retirement in 1820 Bartgis published various newspapers, pamphlets, forms, and books for the rapidly growing population of the Shenandoah, bringing printed culture to the area and including the large German minority.

His newspaper publications include: 
1785-1789. Bartgis’s Marylandische Zeitung, Fredericktown, Md. 
1786-1788.  Maryland Chronicle, Fredericktown, Md.
1787-1788. Pennsylvania Chronicle, York, Pa.
1787-1791. Virginia Gazette, Winchester, Va.
1789. Maryland Gazette, Fredericktown, Md.
1790. Staunton Gazette, Staunton, Va.
1792-1794. Bartgis’s Maryland Gazette, Fredericktown, Md.
1793. General Staats-Bothe, Fredericktown, Md.
1794-1800. Bartgis’s Federal Gazette, Fredericktown, Md.
1800-1820+.  Bartgis’s Republican Gazette, Fredericktown, Md.
1802-1806, 1809-1810, 1813-1814.  Hornet, Fredericktown, Md.
1808. Independent American Volunteer, Fredericktown, Md.
1810-1813. General Staatsbothe, Fredericktown, Md.

References

Brigham, Clarence S. History and Bibliography of American Newspapers, 1690-1820. Vol. 2.  Worcester, MA: American Antiquarian Society, 1947.
Dolmetsch, Christopher, "The German Literature of Virginia's Shenandoah Valley, 1789-1854: A Historical, Linguistic and Literary Study" (Ph.D. diss., U. of Wisconsin-Madison, 1979).
Wust, Klaus G. "Matthias Bartgis' Newspapers in Virginia," ''American-German Review, Vol. XVIII, NO. 1, (October 1951).

External links
The Maryland State Archives page on Matthias Bartgis

1759 births
1825 deaths
American printers
Pennsylvania Dutch culture in Maryland